Percy Jackson (19 January 1907 – 4 August 1970) was an Australian rules footballer who played with Footscray in the Victorian Football League (VFL).

Notes

External links 
		

1907 births
1970 deaths
Australian rules footballers from Victoria (Australia)
Western Bulldogs players